William Grant Callow (April 9, 1921 – March 6, 2018) was an American jurist who served as a justice of the Wisconsin Supreme Court from 1977 to 1992.

Life and career 
Callow was born in Waukesha, Wisconsin and graduated from Waukesha High School. He received his bachelor's and law degrees from the University of Wisconsin Madison and is a veteran of both World War II and the Korean War, serving in the United States Marine Corps in the former and in the United States Air Force in the latter. Following his discharge from the Air Force, Callow served as Waukesha City Attorney from 1952 to 1960.  From 1961 to 1977, Callow served as a judge of the Waukesha County Court, presiding over a felony trial calendar.  As a county judge, Callow gained notoriety for innovations in restorative justice practices and for his general prohibition of plea bargaining. In 1977, Callow was elected to a seat on the Wisconsin Supreme Court vacated by Justice Robert W. Hansen, defeating Milwaukee County Circuit Court judge Robert Watson Landry. Callow is the only Wisconsin county judge elected directly to the Supreme Court; county courts, trial courts of limited jurisdiction, were merged with the circuit court system in 1978.

Callow's judicial philosophy on the Supreme Court was categorized as both moderate and conservative. He served on the court until 1992, when he retired, citing a desire to "take time to smell the roses." Following his retirement, Callow has served as a reserve circuit court judge, as an arbitrator for the Wisconsin Employee Relations Commission, and as a mediator. Callow died, on March 6, 2018, in Oconomowoc, Wisconsin at AngelsGrace Hospice.

Notes

External links

1921 births
2018 deaths
Politicians from Waukesha, Wisconsin
University of Wisconsin–Madison alumni
University of Wisconsin Law School alumni
Justices of the Wisconsin Supreme Court
Wisconsin state court judges
Military personnel from Wisconsin
20th-century American judges
American military personnel of World War II